The Port of Ulsan is a port in South Korea, located in the city of Ulsan.

Hyundai Heavy Industries Ulsan Shipyard & Gunsan shipyard, in Ulsan is currently the largest in the world and has the capability to build a variety of vessels including Commercial Cargo, FPSO offshore, container ship, LNG Carrier, Car carriers, Tankers like VLCC & ULCC, Iron ore carrier and Naval vessels like Aegis destroyers & submarines.

References

Ulsan